Aly Morani is an Indian film producer who has produced films like Dum, Raja Hindustani, Damini, Arjun and Dushmani: A Violent Love Story. He along with his brother Karim Morani own Cineyug, which is a production and event company.

Filmography

Controversies
There was an attempt on his life by the Mumbai underworld.

Personal life
He is married to Yasmin Aly Morani and the couple have two daughters Shirin (wife of Uday J. Singh, brother of Indian actor Vikram Singh) and Noureen Morani.

References

External links 

Film producers from Mumbai
Living people
Year of birth missing (living people)
Hindi film producers
Khoja Ismailism
Gujarati people
Indian Ismailis